Andarzaghar was a 7th-century Sasanian general that fought against the Muslims during the Islamic invasion of Iran. A native of Asoristan, he belonged to a lower rank of land-owning magnates (dehqan) who were centered around the villages and rural subdistricts of the province. He was originally in charge of protecting the borders of Khorasan, but was ordered by the Sasanian king to protect the western frontiers from the Arabs who were plundering Persia. In 633, Andarzaghar, along with Bahman Jadhuyih, with an army composed of Iranians and Christian Arabs, made a counter-attack against the army of Khalid ibn al-Walid at the Walaja, but were defeated. Andarzaghar then fled, and died of thirst in the desert.

References

Sources
 
 
 

Generals of Yazdegerd III
Year of birth unknown
633 deaths
7th-century Iranian people
Dehqans